George Omari Nyamweya (born 25 August 1955) is a Kenyan politician who served as a Member of the National Assembly from 2008 to 2013.

The son of the late former Kenyan Foreign Minister and Kisii politician James Nyamweya. Nyamweya was educated at Kisii School, Nairobi School and King's College London where he obtained an LLB in 1978.

References

1955 births
Living people
Alumni of Kisii School
Alumni of Nairobi School
Alumni of King's College London
Members of the National Assembly (Kenya)
Party of National Unity (Kenya) politicians